Richard Levinge may refer to:
 Sir Richard Levinge, 1st Baronet (1656–1724) Speaker of the Irish House of Commons, also sat in the English House of Commons, and Commons of Great Britain
Sir Richard Levinge, 2nd Baronet (c1690–1748) Irish landowner and politician, MP for Westmeath 1723–27 and for Blessington 1727–48
 Richard Levinge (1724–1783), Irish politician, MP for Duleek 1768-76
Sir Richard Levinge, 7th Baronet (1811–1884), Irish landowner and politician, MP for Westmeath 1857–65
Sir Richard Levinge, 4th Baronet (c 1723–1786) of the Levinge baronets
Sir Richard Levinge, 6th Baronet (1785–1848) of the Levinge baronets
Sir Richard George Augustus Levinge, 7th Baronet (1811–1884) of the Levinge baronets
Sir Richard William Levinge, 10th Baronet (1878–1914) of the Levinge baronets
Sir Richard Vere Henry Levinge, 11th Baronet (1911–1984) of the Levinge baronets
Sir Richard George Robin Levinge, 12th Baronet (born 1946) of the Levinge baronets